Edwin Jay Decker (January 23, 1934 – June 6, 2016) was the head football coach at State University of New York at Cortland in Cortland, New York from 1980 to 1982, where he accumulated a record of 13–17. Prior to that, he had been an assistant at Columbia University and a head coach at several high schools in the state of New York.

Head coaching record

College

References

External links
 

1934 births
2016 deaths
Columbia Lions football coaches
Cortland Red Dragons football coaches
Ithaca Bombers football coaches
High school football coaches in New York (state)
State University of New York at Cortland alumni
Sportspeople from Binghamton, New York